Kolkja is a small borough in Peipsiääre Parish, Tartu County, in southeastern Estonia. As of 2011 Census, the settlement's population was 277.

The Old Believers Museum and the Chicory Museum are located in Kolkja. There are traditional clothes, handicrafts, tools, photos, books and many other items of the Old Believers in the Old Believers museum.

Notable people
Peeter Baranin (1882–1966), politician

Gallery

References

Boroughs and small boroughs in Estonia